Andree Anderson was an American ice dancer born in Chicago, Illinois. She was inducted in the United States Figure Skating Hall of Fame in 1997 along with her skating partner and husband, Donald Jacoby.

Career
Andree Anderson was the 1958 and 1959 U.S. national champion. She and Donald Jacoby were the 1959 World silver medalists and the 1958 World bronze medalists.

The Jacobys turned professional in 1959 in order to tour with Ice Follies.

Results
(with Donald Jacoby)

References

Figure skaters from Chicago
American female ice dancers
Living people
Year of birth missing (living people)
World Figure Skating Championships medalists
21st-century American women